Newton Philo Bevin (October 4, 1895 – October 9, 1976) was an American architect.

Early life and education
He graduated from Princeton University in 1917, and served in World War I.
He received his architecture degree from the University of Pennsylvania in 1922.

From 1927 to 1944, with Henry O. Milliken, he formed the firm Milliken & Bevin, and from 1944 to his death, he practiced as his own firm.

The Milliken-Bevin Trellis (1931) is included in a National Register listing for Roslyn Harbor, NY.

With his wife, Elizabeth Hopkins Bevin, he designed and supervised construction of the Wallace E. Pratt House in the 
Guadalupe Mountains National Park in Texas.

References

1895 births
1976 deaths
American architects
Princeton University alumni
University of Pennsylvania School of Design alumni